The Weavers or Grandmother Despina is a short silent, black and white documentary film made in 1905 by the Balkan film pioneers the Manaki brothers in the small Aromanian village of Avdella, in the Ottoman vilayet of Monastir presently modern Greece. It is about 60 seconds long and depicts the Manakis' aunts and 114-year-old grandmother Despina spinning and weaving. It was originally called "Our 114-year-old grandmother at work weaving", but has come to be known as The Weavers.

It is believed to be the first film shot anywhere in the Ottoman Balkans.

The film was shot with 35 mm film with an Urban Bioscope movie camera (serial number 300) imported from London.

Appropriation

An extract from the film appears at the beginning of Theo Angelopoulos's 1995 film Ulysses' Gaze.

References

Bibliography
 Greece in modern times: an annotated bibliography of works published in English in twenty-two academic disciplines during the twentieth century, 1:109
 Katerina Zacharia, "'Reel' Hellenisms: Perceptions of Greece in Greek Cinema" in Katerina Zacharia, Hellenisms, p. 323

External links
 

1900s short documentary films
Black-and-white documentary films
1905 films
1905 short films
Films shot in Greece 
Greek silent films
Silent films
Articles containing video clips
Weaving
Documentary films about the visual arts
Aromanians in North Macedonia